were armed civil defense units planned in 1945 in the Empire of Japan as a last desperate measure to defend the Japanese home islands against the projected Allied invasion during Operation Downfall (Ketsugo Sakusen) in the final stages of World War II.

They were the Japanese equivalent of the German Volkssturm and British Home Guard. Its commander-in-chief was former Prime Minister General Kuniaki Koiso.

History

Volunteer Corps
In March 1945, the cabinet of Japanese Prime Minister Kuniaki Koiso passed a law establishing the creation of unarmed civil defense units, . With the assistance of the Taisei Yokusankai political party, the tonarigumi and Great Japan Youth Party, units were created by June 1945.

The Kokumin Giyūtai was not combatant, but working unit for fire service, food production, and evacuation. All male civilians between the ages of 12 to 65 years, and females of 12 to 45 years were members. They received training on fire fighting techniques and elementary first aid.

Reformation as militia
In April 1945, the Japanese cabinet resolved on reforming Kokumin Giyūtai into civilian militia. In June, the cabinet passed a special conscription law, and named the militia units .

The Kokumin Giyū Sentōtai would be organized, if Allied landing units came close to the Japanese homeland. Governors of Prefectures could conscript all male civilians between the ages of 15 to 60 years, and unmarried females of 17 to 40 years. Commanders were appointed from retired military personnel and civilians with weapons experience.

Combat training sessions were held, although the corps was primarily assigned to support tasks, such as construction, transportation and rationing.

The Volunteer Fighting Corps was intended as main reserve along with a "second defense line" for Japanese forces to sustain a war of attrition against invading forces. After the Allied invasion, these forces were intended to form resistance or guerilla warfare cells in cities, towns, or mountains.

Strength
Some 28 million men and women were considered "combat capable" by the end of June 1945, yet only about 2 million of them had been recruited by the time the war ended, and most of them did not experience combat due to Japan's surrender before the Allied invasion of the Japanese home islands. The Battle of Okinawa took place before the formation of Volunteer Fighting Corps. At this stage of the war, the lack of modern weaponry and ammunition meant that most were armed with swords or even bamboo spears.

Within Japan proper, the Volunteer Fighting Corps were never used in combat, except in South Sakhalin (the Battle of Okinawa occurred before its formal inception, with local Boeitai home guard conscripts forming part of the defences there). Similar units organized in Japanese territories outside of the Home Islands were used in battle. The units in Korea, Kwangtung, and Manchukuo sustained heavy casualties in combat against the Soviet Union during the Soviet invasion of Manchuria during the last days of World War II.

The Kokumin Giyūtai was abolished by order of the American occupation forces after the surrender of Japan.

Equipment
The Kokumin Giyu Sentōtai units were theoretically armed with weapons including:

Type 94 8 mm Pistol
Type 99 Rifle
Type 30 rifle
Type 38 rifle
Type 44 Cavalry Rifle
Type 5 Anti-aircraft gun
Type 4 20 cm Rocket Launcher
Type 10 Grenade Discharger
Type 89 Grenade Discharger
Ceramic hand grenades
"Lunge AT Mine" (anti-tank mine on bamboo pole)

In actuality, mostly only much less sophisticated arms were available:
"Molotov Cocktails"
Simple pointed bamboo or wood sticks
Swords, bayonets, knives and even pole weapons & staff weapons (e.g. Guntō, Type 30 bayonet, Hori hori, Kamayari/Naginata & Hanbō/Jō)
Clubs and truncheons such as the Kanabō or even simpler
Antiquated firearms (e.g. Murata rifle)
However, Type 4 grenades were in plentiful enough supply due to their ease of manufacture.

See also
 Boeitai
 Gakutotai
 Himeyuri students
 Japanese holdout
 Kamikaze
 Matsushiro Underground Imperial Headquarters
 Senjinkun military code
 Stay-behind

Other Axis nations:
 Black Brigades (Italy)
 Volkssturm (Germany)
 Werwolf (Germany)

References

Citations 

Japan in World War II
Empire of Japan
Paramilitary organizations based in Japan
Civilians in war
Civil defense
Stay-behind organizations
Groups of World War II
Military units and formations of Japan in World War II
Japan campaign
1945 in Japan
Military units and formations established in 1945
Military units and formations disestablished in 1945